Paula Smith (born January 10, 1957) is an American former tennis player.

Smith played 100 tour singles matches and 300 doubles matches between 1976 and 1988. She reached the finals of the French Open once in 1981, partnering Candy Reynolds, and again in mixed doubles in 1985, partnering Francisco González and losing to Martina Navratilova and Heinz Günthardt.  She also reached the finals of the 1982 Toyota Series Championships, the 1983 Family Circle Cup and the final of the doubles in Indiana, 1985.

WTA Tour finals

Doubles 26 (13–13)

Mixed doubles 1

References

External links

 
 
 

1957 births
Living people
American female tennis players
Sportspeople from Boulder, Colorado
Tennis people from Colorado
21st-century American women